967 Helionape is an asteroid belonging to the Flora family of Main Belt asteroids. Its diameter is about 12 km and it has an albedo of 0.178.

References

External links 
 
 

000967
Discoveries by Walter Baade
Named minor planets
19211109